The  is the aggressor unit of the Air Tactics Development Wing of the Japan Air Self-Defense Force based at Komatsu Air Base in Ishikawa Prefecture, Japan.

Aircraft operated

Aggressor
 Mitsubishi T-2 (1981-1990)
 Mitsubishi F-15J/DJ (1990-)

Trainer
 Lockheed T-33A (1981-1992)
 Kawasaki T-4 (1992-)

References

Units of the Japan Air Self-Defense Force